Gilberto Cronie (born 18 December 1996) is a Surinamese professional footballer who plays as a forward and midfielder for SVB Eerste Divisie club Leo Victor and the Suriname national team.

International career 
Cronie's debut for Suriname came in a 3–1 friendly victory over Guyana on 16 March 2019.

References

External links 
 
 

1996 births
Living people
Sportspeople from Paramaribo
Surinamese footballers
Suriname international footballers
Association football forwards
Association football midfielders
S.V. Leo Victor players